El Jannah (Arabic for "paradise" or "heaven") is an Australian family owned fast food restaurant chain that specialises in Lebanese cuisine. It is particularly well known for its main menu item of charcoal Lebanese style chicken and its garlic sauce or toum.

History
Founded by Andre and Carole Estephan, the first El Jannah store opened in the Sydney suburb of Granville in 1998. 

The restaurant has somewhat of a cult following within Sydney and has expanded to 14 outlets across the Sydney metropolitan area, as well as in the Sydney CBD and Macarthur by the late 2010s and early 2020s. 

The chain opened its first outlet outside of Sydney, in the Melbourne suburb of Preston in April 2022.

References

External links

Companies based in Sydney
Fast-food franchises
Fast-food chains of Australia
Fast-food poultry restaurants
Restaurants established in 1998
Australian companies established in 1998
Lebanese cuisine
Asian-Australian culture
Arab-Australian culture
Asian restaurants in Australia